Tetrahedron Provincial Park is a provincial park in British Columbia, Canada, located northeast of Sechelt in the Sunshine Coast area of the province. The park was created in 1995. Its highest point is Tetrahedron Peak, at 1727 metres. It also contains Panther Peak (1681 metres), and Mt. Steele (1651 metres)

References

External links

British Columbia Ministry of the Environment - Tetrahedron Provincial Park

Provincial parks of British Columbia
Sunshine Coast Regional District
Protected areas established in 1995